Boris Sergeyevich Selitsky (born 22 September 1938) is a former Russian weightlifter and Olympic champion who competed for the Soviet Union.

He was born in Leningrad.

Selitsky won a gold medal at the 1968 Summer Olympics in Mexico City.

References

External links

1938 births
Living people
Russian male weightlifters
Soviet male weightlifters
Olympic weightlifters of the Soviet Union
Weightlifters at the 1968 Summer Olympics
Olympic gold medalists for the Soviet Union
Olympic medalists in weightlifting
Medalists at the 1968 Summer Olympics